This is a discography of the Scottish-born Australian rock singer Jimmy Barnes. As of 2019, Barnes has been certified with 48 platinum awards for his solo work and a further 20 platinum awards for his work with Cold Chisel.

Barnes holds the record with the most number 1 albums in Australia, with 15.

Albums

Studio albums

Soundtrack albums

Reissued albums

Live albums

Compilation albums

Singles

Promotional releases

Other albums

Videos and DVDs

Other appearances

Notes

References

External links

Discographies of Australian artists
Rock music discographies